In the history of motion pictures in the United States, many films have been set in Los Angeles respectively in the Los Angeles metropolitan area, or a fictionalized version thereof.

The following is a list of some of the more memorable films set in Los Angeles, however the list includes a number of films which only have a tenuous connection to the city.  The list is sorted by the year the film was released.

1920s
 Souls for Sale (1923)
 Sherlock Jr. (1924)
 Show People (1928)
 The Studio Murder Mystery (1929)

1930s

1940s

1950s

1960s

1970s

1980s

1990s

1990
 Back to the Future Part III  (Universal City, California)
 Internal Affairs 
 Predator 2 
 Pretty Woman 
 To Sleep with Anger 
 The Two Jakes

1991

1992

1993

1994

1995

1996

1997
{{div col|content=
 Air Force One
 Batman & Robin
 Bean
 Beverly Hills Ninja 
 Boogie Nights
 Cats Don't Dance 
 Face/Off
 Jackie Brown 
 L.A. Confidential 
 Lost Highway 
 Money Talks
 Nothing To Lose
 One Eight Seven 
 Speed 2: Cruise Control 
 Steel 
 Volcano
 Quiet Days In Hollywood

1998

1999

2000s

2000

2001

2002

2003

2004

2005

2006

2007

2008

2009

2010s

2010

2011

2012

2013

2014

2015

2016

2017

2018
 Den of Thieves
 Destroyer
 The Happytime Murders
 Peppermint
 Poor Greg Drowning
 The Kissing Booth
 Mid90s
 Electric Love

2019
 Booksmart
 Ford v Ferrari
 Once Upon a Time in Hollywood
 Rocketman
 Stuber
 Yesterday

2020s

2020
 Songbird
 The Tax Collector
 The Way Back
Kajillionaire (2020 film)

2021
 Bliss
 The Little Things
 Licorice Pizza

2022
 Ambulance
 The Bad Guys

Los Angeles destroyed in films

Anime
Pet Shop of Horrors (1999)
Death Note (2006-2007)
Heroman (2010)
Harukana Receive (2018)
Mutafukaz (2018)

Los Angeles Set in Animation

See also
 List of television shows set in Los Angeles
 Lists of films based on location
 Los Angeles Plays Itself (2003), a documentary about the representation of Los Angeles on film

References

Lists of films by setting
Films
!
Films